DR Movie Co., Ltd. is a South Korean animation studio that was established in Seoul in 1990 and frequently works with Japanese companies on anime titles. Since 1991, the studio has been in an exclusive partnership with the Japanese animation studio Madhouse, and in 2001, Madhouse became a partial owner/investor. In 2006, Madhouse's parent company at the time, Index Holdings, invested 600 million yen. DR Movie has been responsible for the animation production end of several Madhouse anime, starting with Tenjho Tenge in 2004 and continuing notably with Claymore in 2007. DR Movie has also been looking to make partnerships with Chinese animation companies for future productions, and as of March 2007 entered into a joint venture studio in Qingdao, China.

Besides Madhouse, DR Movie also has worked extensively with Nickelodeon, Sunrise, Warner Bros Animation, Gonzo, and Studio Ghibli. DR Movie is the only Korean contract studio with which Ghibli has worked.

Additionally, DR Movie maintains a production facility in Busan, known as Busan DR.

Works

Original productions
 Chi's sweet home 
 Elsword: El Lady 
 Flowering Heart (2016–2017; co-production with Bridge and Busan DR) 
 Guardian Fairy Michel
 Metal Fighter T-Boys
 Robotech: The Shadow Chronicles
 Paboo Infinity Force
 The Rising of the Shield Hero (Season 2; co-produced with Kinema Citrus)

As an overseas studio for American production
 Avatar: The Last Airbender - (19 episodes)
 The Batman
 Batman: Mystery of the Batwoman
 Batman and Harley Quinn
 Batman vs. Two-Face
 Dinosaucers
 Godzilla: The Series (Seasons 1 and 2)
 Hellboy: Sword of Storms
 Hellboy: Blood and Iron
 High Guardian Spice
 Hulk and the Agents of S.M.A.S.H.
 Hulk Vs
 Justice League
 Justice League Action
 Justice League Dark
 Loonatics Unleashed (Main Title Production)
 Masters of the Universe: Revelation
 Men in Black: The Series
 Onyx Equinox
 The Simpsons (Season 34 episode "Treehouse of Horror XXXIII" "Death Tome" segment)
 Todd McFarlane's Spawn
 Suicide Squad: Hell to Pay
 Teen Titans ("Switched")
 Young Justice (Season 3)

Notes

References

External links
 DR Movie official site
 
 
 

South Korean animation studios
Entertainment companies of South Korea
Mass media in Seoul
Anime companies
Mass media companies established in 1990
Entertainment companies established in 1990
South Korean companies established in 1990